Paul Wanner (born 23 December 2005) is a professional footballer who plays as a midfielder for Bundesliga club Bayern Munich. Born in Austria, he is a youth international for Germany.

Club career 
Wanner played for the youth team of FV Ravensburg, before joining Bayern Munich's youth team in mid-2018. Wanner was called up by Julian Nagelsmann to the Bayern Munich first team in January 2022, as many of the team's regulars were missing after testing positive for COVID-19. He made his professional debut for Bayern in the Bundesliga on 7 January 2022 against Borussia Mönchengladbach, coming on as a substitute in the 75th minute for Marc Roca. In doing so, he became the youngest player in Bayern Munich's history at the age of 16 years and 15 days, and the second-youngest in Bundesliga history behind Youssoufa Moukoko (who was 14 days younger). The match finished as a 2–1 home loss for Bayern. On 12 October 2022, at the age of 16 years and 293 days, Wanner became Bayern's youngest player in the Champions League, when he came on as a second-half substitute to Dayot Upamecano in a 4–2 away win against Viktoria Plzeň.

International career 
Wanner made his debut for the Germany national under-17 team on 6 August 2021 in a 10–1 win over Poland. In total, he has played seven matches at the under-17 level, and scored two goals in 2022 UEFA European Under-17 Championship qualification. He has been invited by Ralf Rangnick to watch and meet the senior Austria national team in hopes to join and represent them for the UEFA Euro 2024 in Germany.

Personal life 
Wanner was born in the Austrian city of Dornbirn and grew up in Amtzell, Germany. He holds both Austrian and German citizenship. His father Klaus is a German mechanical engineer and former footballer who played as a midfielder, he helped Austria Lustenau as its captain to promotion to second tier 2. Liga and reached the round of last 16 of the Austrian Cup in 1991–92.

Career statistics

Club

References

External links 
 Profile at the FC Bayern Munich website
 
 

2005 births
Association football midfielders
Living people
People from Dornbirn
People from Ravensburg (district)
Sportspeople from Tübingen (region)
Footballers from Baden-Württemberg
German footballers
Germany youth international footballers
Austrian footballers
German people of Austrian descent
Austrian people of German descent
Citizens of Germany through descent
FC Bayern Munich footballers
Bundesliga players